This is the results breakdown of the local elections held in Catalonia on 26 May 1991. The following tables show detailed results in the autonomous community's most populous municipalities, sorted alphabetically.

Overall

City control
The following table lists party control in the most populous municipalities, including provincial capitals (shown in bold). Gains for a party are displayed with the cell's background shaded in that party's colour.

Municipalities

Badalona
Population: 225,207

Barcelona

Population: 1,707,286

Cornellà de Llobregat
Population: 86,287

Girona
Population: 70,876

L'Hospitalet de Llobregat
Population: 276,198

Lleida
Population: 111,825

Mataró
Population: 101,882

Reus
Population: 86,407

Sabadell
Population: 192,142

Sant Cugat del Vallès
Population: 39,316

Santa Coloma de Gramenet
Population: 135,486

Tarragona
Population: 112,360

Terrassa
Population: 161,682

References

Catalonia
1991